Aleksandr Solomonovich Khakhanov born Aleksandre Khakhanashvili (January 3, 1866 – May 25, 1912) was a Georgian-Russian historian, archaeologist, and one of the most acclaimed scholars of Georgian literature.

He was born in Gori, Georgia, then part of Imperial Russia, and studied at Tbilisi . Having graduated from Moscow University in 1888, he delivered lectures on Georgian language and literature at Lazarev Institute of Oriental Languages since 1889 and at Moscow University since 1900. He authored numerous works on Georgian history and literature, including the resonant Очерки по истории грузинской словесности ("Studies in the History of Georgian Literature"), published in Russian from 1895 to 1907. Khakhanov translated several pieces of Georgian written and oral literature into Russian, and conducted extensive research in Georgia, Italy, France and England to reveal old Georgian manuscripts. In 1900, he published Histoire de Géorgie ("History of Georgia") in French.

References

1864 births
1912 deaths
Burials at Didube Pantheon
20th-century historians from Georgia (country)
Historians from the Russian Empire
Male writers from the Russian Empire
Translators from the Russian Empire
People from Gori, Georgia
Translators to Russian
Kartvelian studies scholars
Imperial Moscow University alumni
19th-century translators from the Russian Empire
19th-century male writers from the Russian Empire
19th-century historians from Georgia (country)